The yellow-bellied marmot (Marmota flaviventris), also known as the rock chuck, is a large, stout-bodied ground squirrel in the marmot genus. It is one of fourteen species of marmots, and is native to mountainous regions of southwestern Canada and western United States, including the Rocky Mountains, Sierra Nevada, and Mount Rainier in the state of Washington, typically living above . They live in burrows in colonies of up to twenty individuals with a single dominant male. They are diurnal and feed on plant material, insects, and bird eggs. They hibernate for approximately eight months starting in September and lasting through the winter.

Description 

Yellow-bellied marmots usually weigh from  when fully grown, though males typically weigh more than females. The weight fluctuates quite drastically through the year, with the least measured in early spring and the most measured in early autumn.

They have a rather frosty appearance with some of the guard hairs having pale tips with dark bands. The yellow-bellied marmot has a broad and flat skull, dark head, and a dark nose with a white furry patch. The pelage comprises coarse, long outer hairs and woolly, shorter underfurs. They have a brown coat, a white patch of fur on the snout in front of the eyes. Due to the bright yellow fur on their belly, sides of the neck, and throat, they get their scientific and common names. Their back is reddish-brown in color with grizzled black and light-grey tan. Their feet are yellowish to dark brown to in color. They gain additional fat reserves in the autumn, in preparation for hibernation.

Distribution and habitat 

The yellow-bellied marmot lives in southwestern Canada and western United States, including the Rocky Mountains and the Sierra Nevada. Northwards, its range extends into the southern British Columbia and goes eastwards up to the montane and basin regions of Wyoming, eastern Montana, Colorado, and southern Alberta. Southwards, its range extends into northern New Mexico. It inhabits steppes, meadows, talus fields, and other open habitats, sometimes on the edge of deciduous or coniferous forests. In central and eastern Washington, they are common at low elevations.

They are found in valleys, meadows, and foothills, and tend to occupy open areas which are free of vegetation. Their territory is about  around a number of burrows dug during the summer. They choose to dig burrows under rocks, as it is less likely to be visible to predators. These predators include foxes, dogs, coyotes, wolves, and eagles. Upon seeing a predator, the yellow-bellied marmot whistles to warn the others in the area, after which it typically hides in a nearby rock pile until there is no more threat.

Biology

Behavior 

Marmots reproduce starting at around two years of age, and may live up to an age of fifteen. They reside in colonies of about ten to twenty individuals. Each male marmot digs a burrow soon after it wakes from hibernation, and starts looking for females to reproduce. By summer, it may have up to four female mates. Litters usually average three to five offspring per female. Only about half of those pups survive and become yearlings. Marmots have a "harem-polygynous" mating system in which the male reproduces with two or three females at the same time. Female offspring tend to stay in the area around their home, while male offspring typically leave when they are yearlings and will defend one or more females.

Yellow-bellied marmots spend about 80% of their lives in their burrows, 60% of which is spent hibernation. They often spend mid-day and night in a burrow as well. These burrows are usually constructed on a slope, such as a hill, mountain, or cliff. Their hibernation period varies on elevation, but it is typically from September to May. Occasionally, they climb trees and other flora, though they are usually terrestrial.

Diet 
Yellow-bellied marmots are diurnal, and are less active during the night. They are omnivores, but generally eat a wide variety of plants, as they are generalist herbivores. They mostly feed on grass, grains, leaves, flowers, legumes, bird eggs, and insects. Occasionally, they are also known to eat fruits and bark of fruit trees. In food choice experiments, yellow-bellied marmots are known to reject plants containing defensive compounds. Due to this, they consume flowers of lupinus, larkspur, and columbine, but avoid their shoots containing toxic compounds. Their food choice depends upon the fatty acid and protein concentrations, which are well present in cinquefoil, cow-parsnip, and leaves of dandelion, which are also present in their diet. In late summer, however, grasses, forbs, and seeds make up most of their diet. They also like to feed on alfalfa and clover. They drink less water, as their plant diet mostly serves their water requirements.

Status and conservation 
Since 1996, it has been listed in the least concern category of the IUCN Red List of Endangered species. As there are no major threats to this species and it is protected in several areas throughout its range, there is not much concern for serious conservation efforts to be put in place.

References

Notes

External links 

Yellow-bellied
Yellow-bellied marmot
Fauna of the Sierra Nevada (United States)
Fauna of the Western United States
Mammals of Canada
Mammals of the United States
Yellow-bellied marmot
Yellow-bellied marmot